The Danger Islands is a group of small islands lying  east-south-east of Joinville Island near the tip of the Antarctic Peninsula. They were discovered on 28 December 1842 by a British expedition under James Clark Ross, who so named them because, appearing among heavy fragments of ice, they were almost completely concealed until the ship was nearly upon them.

The Danger Islands comprise:
Beagle Island
Darwin Island
Earle Island
Heroína Island
Peine Island
Plato Island

Use by birds
The Danger Islands have been identified as an Important Bird Area by BirdLife International because it supports Adélie penguin colonies and seabirds. 751,527 pairs of Adélie penguins (1.5 million individuals) have been recorded in at least five distinct colonies as of March 2018.

See also 
 List of Antarctic and subantarctic islands

References 

Islands of the Joinville Island group
Important Bird Areas of Antarctica
Penguin colonies